Caleb Garling is an American writer with Wired among other publications.

Early life
He graduated with a degree in molecular, cellular and developmental biology from The University of Colorado at Boulder. In college, he made money as a fly fishing guide.

He plays the electric guitar.

Career
He began as a neurology researcher for Harvard Medical School. He abandoned the pursuit of a medical degree and went on to work in strategy at startup software companies. Fed up with corporate life, he left to pursue writing and journalism.

He has written about technology, science, music and sports for Wired.

He covered the case Oracle America, Inc. v. Google, Inc. and became known for his style of humor and clear explanations throughout the trial.

His review of Radiohead's album The King of Limbs garnered both support and criticism when he argued the band had dealt a death blow to the concept of the album.

Author
He is an avid fly fisherman and the author of the book The St George's Angling Club.

References

1981 births
Living people
American male writers
Wired (magazine) people
University of Colorado Boulder alumni